Shakuntla Khatak is a member of the Haryana Legislative Assembly from the Indian National Congress representing the Kalanaur constituency. She was re-elected in 2014 and 2019.

References 

Year of birth missing
Haryana MLAs 2019–2024
Haryana MLAs 2014–2019
Women members of the Haryana Legislative Assembly
21st-century Indian women politicians